

List of Rulers of the Akan state of Akuapem Okere

See also
Akan
Ghana
Gold Coast
Lists of Incumbents

Politics of Ghana